Colón is a province of Panama. The capital is the city of Colón. It covers an area of 4,575.5 sq.km, and the latest estimate of population (for 2019) is 294,060.

Overview
This province has traditionally been focused on commerce (through the Colón Free Zone, Panama Canal, and its banking activities), but also has natural resources that are being developed as a tourist attraction, such as coral reefs and rainforests. During the Spanish colonial period, the Colon region of Panama was the center of trade, commerce, and overall economy for the Spanish. They imported many black African slaves to this area to work in Panama and to ship to other Spaniard colonies.

Most of the black population in Panama is centered in the Province of Colon.  Panama has two distinct groups of black people. The first and earliest black people were those who came as slaves as early as the fifteenth century, through much of the nineteenth century. They are of mixed African and Spanish descent. This group is known as Cimarrones, Afro Colonials, Nativos, Playeros, Congos. These terms have proven crucial in establishing that these are the first and original black people of the Republic of Panama. Afro Colonials have held on to their culture and adopted Hispanic customs, traits, and cultures. They took and assumed Spanish names and surnames. They also developed the beginning of Panama's black population and culture, in pure and mixed forms. They have been incorporated into Panamanian and Spanish-speaking society, as a result.

In the nineteenth century, beginning as early as the 1840s, black people from the Caribbean and West Indies immigrated to Panama to assist to build the Panama Railway and the Panama Canal. Later many black people from all over the Caribbean and West Indies, especially from Jamaica and Barbados, settled here between the years of 1880 and 1901 to build the Panama Canal.  Many later settled in the Colon Province. This group of Caribbean and/or West Indian origin are called Afro Antillanos by the Hispanic Panamanians. They have assimilated to the Hispanic culture and  Panama as well as holding on to aspects of their descent and culture. They have influenced the cuisine and music of Panama. Most importantly, their influence on music, especially from those of Jamaican descent invented and created Reggae en Español.

Administrative divisions
Since the creation of Omar Torrijos Herrera District in 2018, Colón Province is divided into six districts (distritos) which are subdivided into 42 corregimientos.

1 - These corregimientos make up Colón City.

References 

 
Provinces of Panama